Atractus clarki, Clark's ground snake, is a species of snake in the family Colubridae. The species can be found in Panama and Colombia. It is oviparous.

References 

Atractus
Reptiles of Panama
Reptiles of Colombia
Snakes of South America
Reptiles described in 1939
Taxa named by Emmett Reid Dunn